The 1952 Greyhound Derby took place during June with the final being held on 28 June 1952 at White City Stadium. The winning owner and breeder of Endless Gossip, Henry Ernest Gocher, received a first prize of £1,500. Trainer Leslie Reynolds won a fourth Derby, extending his record further.

Final result 
At White City (over 525 yards):

Distances 
3½, 3, 2½, 3, DNF
The distances between the greyhounds are in finishing order and shown in lengths. From 1950 one length was equal to 0.08 of one second.

Review
Trafalgar Cup champion Magourna Reject, owned by Mrs Frances Chandler and trained by Noreen Collin was the ante post favourite for the 1952 Derby, the blue brindle and white dog had never been out of the first three in his career to date. Three times Derby winning trainer Leslie Reynolds was represented by the defending champion Ballylanigan Tanist and a newcomer called Endless Gossip. Black Mire reappearing after injury was another fancied to do well.

Endless Gossip recorded 28.52 seconds, in winning by ten lengths and recording a sectional split of 15.94, the first ever greyhound to break 16 seconds. Ballylanigan Tanist also won in a fast time of 28.61 and Black Mire progressed after recovering from a recent injury but there was a shock elimination when Magourna Reject ran poorly.

The second round drew two of the big names together, the Reynolds pair of Ballylanigan Tanist and Endless Gossip, the former broke well but was badly baulked by Murex of Munster ending his chances to qualify, Endless Gossip missed the break but avoided the trouble and went on to win in 28.70.

Grand National finalist Drumman Rambler had been switched back to the flat after racing over hurdles and had performed well by getting through each round and he won the first semi-final, Paddys Dinner and Shaggy Newshound confirmed their places in the final by finishing second and third in the race. The second semi-final provided a shock as Endless Gossip missed the break again and was badly impeded, only just qualifying in third place behind Dashboard Dan and Caseys Seal. He had finished well to catch Outcast Billy on the last bend.

Leading up to the final, two greyhounds Shaggy Newshound and Paddys Dinner were carrying injuries and battling against time to be fit for the decider. In the final Endless Gossip broke from the traps in third place behind Drumman Rambler and Shaggy Newshound but then took a commanding lead out of the second bend. He stayed in front to win comfortably in a new Derby record of 28.50 seconds. Paddys Dinner felt his injury and pulled up lame.

See also
1952 UK & Ireland Greyhound Racing Year

References

Greyhound Derby
English Greyhound Derby
English Greyhound Derby
English Greyhound Derby